Elizabeth Norman McKay (née Norman) (1931 – 20 May 2018) was an English musicologist, pianist and Lieder accompanist.

McKay graduated from Lawnswood High School in Leeds in 1947/48.

She gained a degree in Physics from Bristol University, and worked in London as a pianist, accompanist, and repetiteur. In 1962 she was awarded a D.Phil. from the University of Oxford (where she studied at Somerville College) for her thesis on Schubert's music for the theatre.

She was formerly Tutor in Piano and Visiting Professor at the Birmingham Conservatoire.

Her publications include three books on Franz Schubert, and many contributions to symposia and dictionaries.

Selected bibliography 
 1962 The stage-works of Schubert, considered in the framework of Austrian Biedermeier society
 1991 Franz Schubert's music for the theatre
 1987 The impact of the new pianofortes on classical keyboard style : Mozart, Beethoven, and Schubert
 1996 / 2001 Franz Schubert : a biography
 1998 The Oxford Bicentenary Symposium 1997 : Bericht - The Biedermeier and Beyond (1997)
 1998 Schubert's string and piano duos in context
 2003 Schubert and the theatre
 2009 Schubert : the piano and dark keys

References

External links 
 Elizabeth Norman McKay
 Lawnswood High School Elizabeth Norman McKay

1930 births
2018 deaths
People from London
English music historians
English writers about music
English musicologists
Women musicologists
English classical pianists
English women pianists
Accompanists
Schubert scholars
Alumni of the University of Bristol
British women historians
Alumni of Somerville College, Oxford
Women classical pianists
People educated at Lawnswood High School